Veli-Matti Puumala (born 18 July 1965, Kaustinen, Finland) is a Finnish composer. He is currently (since 2005) the professor of composition at the Sibelius Academy.

Puumala studied composition in Helsinki under Paavo Heininen from 1984 to 1993 and in Siena under Franco Donatoni in 1989 and 1990. His musical style is rooted in European Modernism, but has been also described to contain stylised references to folk music and modal elements. In addition to instrumental and vocal music, Puumala has also composed a number of electronic works and one radiophonic work, Rajamailla (Borderlands), which won the Prix Italia in 2001.  His piano concerto Seeds of Time was awarded the Teosto Prize by the Finnish Composers' Copyright Society in 2005, and in 2011 he was awarded the Erik Bergman Jubilee Prize "in recognition of his excellent, versatile work continuing the ethical and spiritual tradition of Modernism".
Puumala is also known as a musical educator: he has taught music theory since 1989 and composition since 1997 at the Sibelius Academy and was appointed as a professor of composition in 2005.

Selected works 
 Scroscio (1989) for chamber ensemble
 Verso (1990–91) for chamber ensemble
 Ghirlande (1992) for chamber ensemble
 Line to Clash (1991–93) for orchestra
 Tutta via (1992–93) for chamber orchestra
 String Quartet (1994)
 Chant Chains (1994–95) for chamber orchestra
 Chains of Camenæ (1995–96) for orchestra
 Soira (1996) for accordion and chamber orchestra
 Chainsprings (1995–97) for orchestra
 Taon (1998-2000) for double bass and chamber orchestra
 Seeds of Time (2004) for piano and orchestra
 Mure (2008) for chamber ensemble
 Anna Liisa (2001–08), opera in three acts, libretto by the composer and Tiina Käkelä-Puumala based on a play by Minna Canth.
 Rope (2010–12) for orchestra 
 Tear (2012–13) for chamber orchestra
 Rime (2012–13) for string orchestra
 Root (2015-17) for orchestra

References

Sources 
Hillilä, Ruth-Ester and Hong, Barbara B. 1997. "Historical Dictionary of the Music and Musicians of Finland". Greenwood. 

1965 births
Living people
20th-century classical composers
21st-century classical composers
Finnish classical composers
Sibelius Academy alumni
Finnish male classical composers
20th-century male musicians
21st-century male musicians
20th-century Finnish composers
21st-century Finnish composers